Sattar Basheer (1924–1987) was an Indian footballer. He competed in the men's tournament at the 1948 Summer Olympics.

References

External links
 

1924 births
1987 deaths
Indian footballers
Footballers from Bangalore
India international footballers
Olympic footballers of India
Footballers at the 1948 Summer Olympics
Place of birth missing
Association football midfielders